Elcors "Shingzie" Howard was an actress in the U.S. She appeared in several  Oscar Michaux films. She also worked for the Colored Players Film Corporation.

After she married she became known as Shingzie Howard McClane. She retired from filmmaking and became a teacher. She appeared in the "Midnight Ramble" episode of American Experience in 1994.

Filmography
The Virgin of Seminole (1922)
Jasper Landry's Will (1922)
The Dungeon (1922) as Myrtle Downing
A Son of Satan (1924)
The House Behind the Cedars (1927) as Rena
The Prince of His Race (1926)
Children of Fate (1928)

See also
Evelyn Preer

References

External links
Findagrave entry

Year of birth missing
Year of death missing
African-American actresses